The Wilkins Farm is a historic farmstead at 989 Swover Creek Road in rural Shenandoah County, Virginia, near Edinburg.  The home was recognized under three criterion. Criterion A under  Exploration/Settlement as a late 18th-century German farmstead, Criterion B in the area of Art as the boyhood home of fraktur artist Emanuel Wilkins, and Criterion C for Architecture of German builders who used native materials of limestone, hardwoods and Yellow pine. The primary dwelling on the farm was a frontier log structure, c.1776 that was evolved to a two-story midland folk, log home c. 1789.  The older portion, a simple log cabin, was built by Augustine Cofman in order to satisfy the requirements of a land grant he had received the prior year, which required placement of a dwelling on the  grant.  A
The larger, two- story log structure was built with the cabin as a side ell.  The farm was in the Wilkins family from 1824 until 2003.

The farmstead was listed on the National Register of Historic Places in 2014.

See also
National Register of Historic Places listings in Shenandoah County, Virginia

References
VDHR 85-216

Houses on the National Register of Historic Places in Virginia
Farms on the National Register of Historic Places in Virginia
Houses completed in 1789
Houses in Shenandoah County, Virginia
National Register of Historic Places in Shenandoah County, Virginia
1789 establishments in Virginia